Colonel John "Hannibal" Smith is a fictional character and one of the four protagonists of the 1980s action-adventure television series The A-Team, played by George Peppard. The producers originally had James Coburn in mind to play the part of Hannibal, but it eventually went to Peppard.

The character—which was based loosely on former United States Army Special Forces officer Bo Gritz—appeared on The A-Team from its beginning in 1983 until its end in 1987. The character was played by Liam Neeson in the 2010 film adaptation. His often spoken line "I love it when a plan comes together" was included in TV Land's "The 100 Greatest TV Quotes and Catch Phrases" in 2006.

Character biography
The A-Team is a group of ex-United States Army Special Forces soldiers who, near the end of the Vietnam War, were arrested for a crime they did not commit and managed to escape from the Military Police. As fugitives, the A-Team works as soldiers of fortune, using their military training to fight oppression or injustice. Hannibal, along with B. A. Baracus, Templeton "Faceman" Peck, and H. M. "Howlin' Mad" Murdock make up the A-Team.

In the pilot episode ("Mexican Slayride: Part 1"), Hannibal is described by a reporter colleague of Amy Allen as follows: "The leader [of the A-Team] is a Colonel named John Smith. But everybody calls him Hannibal. The guy has a very unorthodox style." Smith takes his name from the famous military commander and strategist, as alluded to by B. A. Baracus in the same episode; various items of tie-in literature for the series commented that just as the original Hannibal had led the elephants over the Alps, this Hannibal had led his men over the wall of Fort Bragg after they were wrongly arrested. He is distinguished by his unflappable demeanor, even when in peril, his constant cigar-smoking, his black leather gloves, and his many disguises. He is a master tactician (although his plans rarely turn out as they are supposed to; when asked if she thought this was going to work, Amy Allen summed it up by saying, "Hannibal's plans never work right. They just work.") and seems to have a plan for getting the team out of any situation they get into. His favorite catchphrase is, "I love it when a plan comes together"; he is often heard to remark "Nice" after part of his plan has succeeded - sometimes with destructive or explosive results.

He fought in both the Korean and Vietnam Wars, serving in the 5th Special Forces Group in Vietnam, and is a Medal of Honor recipient.  His rank is inconsistent: throughout the first four seasons, he is referred to as possessing the rank of lieutenant colonel, though in keeping with US Army practice, he is most often referred to simply as "Colonel". In the fourth-season episode "Members Only" and fifth-season episodes "Trial by Fire" and "Firing Line", however, he is wearing the eagle insignia of a full colonel. (His medals in these episodes are also different from those on display the last time he wore his Class A uniform in the first-season finale, "A Nice Place to Visit".) Hannibal's Social Security Number, revealed in the fifth-season episode "Dishpan Man", is 044-34-0681B. Thriving on adventure and the adrenaline rush of life-threatening situations (or being "on the jazz", as the rest of the team refers to it), he seems to genuinely enjoy every challenge they encounter. He is renowned by both allies and enemies for being cool-headed and extremely clever. There is rarely a situation where he is not able to smile in the face of adversity. He will usually light up a cigar when he needs to do some thinking—often when coming up with a plan, or in the heat of a dangerous or exciting moment. He is also often seen putting on his gloves when he senses the action is about to pick up (such as a fist fight breaking out). When captured by their enemies, he will deliver flippant or sarcastic remarks. He regularly dispenses aphorisms, especially to their foes, upon defeating them. He also has some medical skills which he picked up when in Vietnam.

He styles himself a "master of disguise", though his skill lies not so much in how convincing his disguise is, but in his ability to assume any role and convince others that his role is genuine. Most episodes begin with the prospective clients coming to meet the A-Team, only to be introduced to one of Hannibal's comic aliases. Hannibal uses his various disguises to screen all the A-Team's potential clients to assure they are not fronts for the military—sometimes playing more than one at a time. Clients often make reference to a "Mr. Lee", the owner of a Chinese laundromat who tells them where to meet the team.

Hannibal is also an aspiring actor, playing monsters in low-budget horror movies (being a fugitive, he can only choose roles in which his face cannot be seen). His many roles include "Gatorella", "Killgator" and his most famous, "The Aquamaniac". Naturally, Hannibal secures his roles playing his own agent; somehow always 'eluding' the Producer of his true identity.

Romantic relationships
 Dr. Maggie Sullivan (season 1 episode 6 "Black Day at Bad Rock") – In an uncharacteristic moment in the series, it is Hannibal who is capable of seducing the episode's leading female role, rather than Face. The character of Maggie Sullivan returns in season 2, episode 21 "Deadly Maneuvers", where Hannibal and the doctor still seem to care for one another.
 Anne Sanders (season 3 episode 4 "Fire!") - The A-Team is hired by a female firefighter played by Stepfanie Kramer who is capable of challenging Hannibal. The sexual tension between the two rises throughout the episode. Hannibal seemingly gives in to a short fling with the woman, and they share a kiss at the end of the episode. She is not seen in any subsequent episodes.

Recurring aliases
 "Mr. Lee" – The owner of a Chinese laundromat, who often makes use of clichéd Chinese proverbs and is of unpredictable mood. Mr. Lee only appears on-screen in the pilot episode "Mexican Slayride: Part 1" (although a shot of Hannibal in character as Mr. Lee is used as part of the first season opening credits sequence). However, the alias of Mr. Lee is often referred to throughout the series by clients and by the team itself, though these examples tended to fade out after the first two seasons. Typically "Mr. Lee" is the first one to screen potential clients and then refers them to a second location to meet a second liaison on behalf of the team.

Awards and decorations

"A Nice Place to Visit"
The following are the medals and service awards fictionally worn by Lieutenant Colonel Smith in "A Nice Place to Visit".

"Members Only"
The following are the medals and service awards fictionally worn by Colonel Smith in "Members Only".

"Trial by Fire" and "Firing Line"
The following are the medals and service awards fictionally worn by Colonel Smith in "Trial by Fire" and "Firing Line".

2010 film

In the 2010 movie adaptation, Hannibal is portrayed by Liam Neeson. Identified as "John H. Smith" on a toe tag, Hannibal is portrayed as a character who, though still tactically brilliant and capable of making a plan come together, is not quite as unflappable as his television counterpart. In fact, due to the betrayal nature of the storyline (concerning the "crime they did not commit"), Hannibal is often shown as angry and intense. The team's conviction by military court visibly affects him, though his penchant for wisecracks is still prevalent (for the television character, more than a decade had passed since the conviction so such reactions were never shown in the show).

Except at an airport when the A-Team is flying from Norway to Los Angeles (in which Hannibal's disguise is Neeson's real-life appearance), the character does not don any disguises in the film, instead leaving that arm of business to Face. The cigar smoking was also kept intact; despite Neeson being an ex-smoker, he kept his personal preferences aside for the role. Hannibal shows considerable leadership abilities, attempting to take the A-Team's full blame for their alleged crime, and breaking them out of prison when they reject it; however, he steps back and lets Face plan the final mission, a decision B. A. regrets.

In the film, Hannibal is a full colonel, has served in both the Army's 75th Ranger Regiment and the 7th Special Forces Group, in which he and his team are still members until their court martial, and has served a total of two and a half years in overseas combat zones. Unlike the TV series, Hannibal is not a Medal of Honor recipient. Like B.A., Face, and Murdock, he has an Army Ranger tattoo (on his left arm).

Awards and decorations
The following are the medals and service awards fictionally worn by Colonel Smith in the 2010 movie adaptation.

References

External links
 Comparing Hannibal Smith & Hannibal the Barcid

American male characters in television
Fictional colonels
Fictional Korean War veterans
Fictional Medal of Honor recipients
Fictional mercenaries
Fictional military strategists
Fictional private military members
Fictional United States Army Rangers personnel
Fictional United States Army Special Forces personnel
Fictional Vietnam War veterans
Television characters introduced in 1983
The A-Team characters

fr:Agence tous risques#Colonel John « Hannibal » Smith